Bob Cain (August 11, 1934 – September 2, 2014) was an American radio and television journalist known for his work on NBC Radio from 1971 until 1980 and on CNN from 1980 until 2001.

Cain was an anchor for CNN Daybreak and during the Gulf War and the Centennial Olympic Park bombing. He was Roman Catholic.

References

American television reporters and correspondents
2014 deaths
1934 births
People from O'Neill, Nebraska
CNN people
Catholics from Nebraska